Huécija is a municipality of Almería province, in the autonomous community of Andalusia, Spain.

It has two churches, one of which the Convento de los Agustinos, is notable as an example of baroque architecture.

Demographics

References

External links
  Huécija - Ayuntamiento de Huécija

Municipalities in the Province of Almería